Eckhard, Bishop of Poznań was an 11th-12th century Catholic Bishop of German descent known from records in the 16th century of the Abbey of Saints Simon and Judas in Goslar. Before being appointed Bishop he was provost of the Abbey under Franko. 
He served as the Bishop at the end of the reign of Władysław Herman who died 1102AD.

References 

Bishops of Poznań
11th-century Polish bishops
Year of birth unknown
11th-century births
12th-century deaths